Rock the Universe is an annual Christian rock festival that takes place at Universal Studios Florida. It started in 1998, and it used to take place in September. Since 2019, the festival is celebrated on the first weekend of February.

The festival has had three stages over the years. The main stage is located at the Universal Music Plaza Stage in the Production Central area. The Hollywood Stage is located at the lake near the Hollywood area. The Coca-Cola fan-zone stage is located in the New York area. And the Praise and Worship Stage is located in the Animal Actors on Location theater.

Lineups by Year

2023

2022

The 2021 event was scheduled to last two nights in January, but the event was quietly cancelled.

2020

2019

2018

2017

The 2017 event was scheduled to last two nights, but the September 9 event was cancelled as a precautionary measure against Hurricane Irma. Park tickets for September 9 could either be honored on September 8 or returned for a full refund.

2016

2015

2014

2013

2012

The official lineup was announced on March 5, 2012

2011

The official lineup was announced in late February 2011.

2010

The official lineup was announced on March 3, 2010.

2009

The official lineup was announced in March 2009.

2008

2007

2006

2005

2004

2003

2002

2001

2000

1999

1998

External links
Official Rock the Universe Site

Christian music festivals
Recurring events established in 1998
Music festivals in Orlando, Florida
Christianity in Orlando, Florida
Universal Studios Florida
Universal Parks & Resorts attractions by name
1998 establishments in Florida